The 1835 Rhode Island gubernatorial election was held on April 15, 1835.

Incumbent Democratic Governor John Brown Francis won re-election to a third term, defeating Whig nominee Nehemiah R. Knight in a re-match of the previous year's election..

General election

Candidates
John Brown Francis, Democratic, incumbent Governor
Nehemiah R. Knight, Whig, incumbent U.S. Senator, former Governor

Results

References

1835
Rhode Island
Gubernatorial